Šentjanž pri Dravogradu ( or ) is a settlement on the left bank of the Mislinja River south of Dravograd in northern Slovenia, in the traditional region of Styria.

Mass graves
Šentjanž pri Dravogradu is the site of two known mass graves associated with the Second World War. It contains the remains of an unknown number of Croatian soldiers. It contains the remains of at least 62 Croatian soldiers.

Church
The local parish church, from which the settlement gets its name, is dedicated to the John the Baptist. It was first mentioned in written documents dating to 1305. The current building dates to the 15th century with some later adaptations. It belongs to the Roman Catholic Archdiocese of Maribor.

References

External links

Šentjanž pri Dravogradu on Geopedia

Populated places in the Municipality of Dravograd